Marcel Coppin (27 April 1928 – 17 September 2008) was a Luxembourgian gymnast. He competed at the 1952 Summer Olympics and the 1960 Summer Olympics.

References

External links
 

1928 births
2008 deaths
Luxembourgian male artistic gymnasts
Olympic gymnasts of Luxembourg
Gymnasts at the 1952 Summer Olympics
Gymnasts at the 1960 Summer Olympics
Gymnasts from Paris